Wheels is an Australian automotive magazine owned by Are Media. The publication is well-renowned by Australian car enthusiasts. Its main competitor within the Australian car magazine market is Motor, though Wheels and Motor are stablemates in the Bauer Media Group catalogue and are aimed at slightly different readers as Motor puts more attention on performance cars. Wheels magazine is sold in Australia and New Zealand only and can be found at stores such as newsagents. The magazine was published monthly by Bauer Media Pty Ltd. and has its headquarters in Melbourne.

History
Wheels was founded in May 1953 by Ray. With the help of a colleague, Yeomans planned the first copy of Wheels in a stationery room of Hudson Publications in Sydney.

Since 1963, Wheels has annually announced its Car of the Year award, although this has been withheld in 1972, 1979 and 1986. The award was created by Bill Tuckey.

It was announced in September 2010 that Bill Thomas, former deputy editor of BBC Top Gear Magazine in the UK, would take over as editor in November 2010.

In October 2012, it was announced that former Top Gear Australia magazine editor Stephen Corby was to become editor of Wheels, replacing Bill Thomas.

For the October 2013 issue, Ben Oliver drove a Volvo S60 Polestar from Melbourne to Sydney along the Hume Highway, and Wheels launched the "Raise the limit, lower the toll" petition to raise the speed limit to 130 km/h, as it is in the Northern Territory. The campaign has since received lots of media coverage and acclamation among Australian motoring enthusiasts.

Glenn Butler was the publication’s editor from 2014 through 2016. He was replaced by Alex Inwood, former deputy editor of the magazine, who was appointed editor of Wheels in March 2017.

In the February 2018 issue, the magazine was redesigned with new fonts, thicker paper, a cleaner style and appearance and a greater emphasis on hero photography.

In the October 2020 issue, the publication’s editor of three years, Alex Inwood, left the magazine. His replacement is former Motor editor, Dylan Campbell.

In 2020, Wheels was acquired by Are Media, the successor to Bauer Media Australia.

From June 2022, the former editor of Motor, Andy Enright, was appointed as editor of Wheels.

WHEELS EDITOR TIMELINE
 1953-56 Athol Yeomans
 1956-58 Ian Simpson
 1958-63 Ian Fraser
 1963-68 Bill Tuckey
 1968-71 Rob Luck
 1971-87 Peter Robinson
 1987-94 Phil Scott
 1994-99 Angus MacKenzie
 1999-02 Ewen Page
 2002-10 Ged Bulmer
 2010-12 Bill Thomas
 2012-13 Stephen Corby
 2013-16 Glenn Butler
 2016-20 Alex Inwood
 2020-21 Dylan Campbell
 2021-22 Ash Westerman (acting)
 2022- Andy Enright

References

External links 

1953 establishments in Australia
Are Media
Automobile magazines published in Australia
Magazines established in 1953
Magazines published in Sydney
Mass media in Melbourne
Monthly magazines published in Australia